Ketija Birzule (born 30 October 1998) is a Latvian sailor. She represented her country at the 2016 Summer Olympics.

References

External links
 
 
 
 

1998 births
Living people
Latvian female sailors (sport)
Olympic sailors of Latvia
Sailors at the 2016 Summer Olympics – RS:X
Sailors at the 2014 Summer Youth Olympics
Latvian windsurfers
Female windsurfers